Pan Books is a publishing imprint that first became active in the 1940s and is now part of the British-based Macmillan Publishers, owned by the Georg von Holtzbrinck Publishing Group of Germany.

Pan Books began as an independent publisher, established in 1944 by Alan Bott, previously known for his memoirs of his experiences as a flying ace in the First World War. The Pan Books logo, showing the ancient Greek god Pan playing pan-pipes, was designed by Mervyn Peake.The later version was by Edward Young who also designed the logo for Penguin.

A few years after it was founded, Pan Books was bought out by a consortium of several publishing houses, including Macmillan, Collins, Heinemann, and, briefly, Hodder & Stoughton. It became wholly owned by Macmillan in 1987.

Pan specialised in publishing paperback fiction and, along with Penguin Books, was one of the first popular publishers of this format in the UK. Many popular authors saw their works given paperback publication through Pan, including Ian Fleming, whose James Bond series first appeared in paperback in the UK as Pan titles. So too did Leslie Charteris's books about The Saint, Peter O'Donnell's Modesty Blaise, and numerous novels by Edgar Wallace, Agatha Christie, Erle Stanley Gardner, Peter Cheyney, Georgette Heyer, Neville Shute, John Steinbeck, Josephine Tey and Arthur Upfield. Pan also published paperback editions of works by classic authors such as Jane Austen and Charles Dickens. Another notable title was The Hitchhiker's Guide to the Galaxy by Douglas Adams.

During the 1950s and 60s, Pan Books editions were noted for their colourful covers, which have made many of them collectables, particularly the Fleming and Charteris novels. Around 2,000 different pieces of cover artwork were commissioned between 1955 and 1965. Many of the artists remain largely unknown today. They include Rex Archer (1928–?), SR Boldero (1898–1987), Roger Hall, Edward Mortelmans, John Pollack (1918–1985), Sam Peffer, Dave Taylor (1921–1985) and Carl Wilton.

The Pan imprint continues to publish a broad list of popular fiction and non-fiction. Among its current authors are Ken Follett, Kate Morton, Jeffrey Archer, Peter James, David Baldacci, Joanna Trollope, C.J. Sansom, Scott Turow and Danielle Steel.

References

Book publishing companies of the United Kingdom
Publishing companies based in London
Holtzbrinck Publishing Group

British companies established in 1944
1944 establishments in England